George Sterling Ansel Ryerson (January 21, 1855 – May 20, 1925) was an Ontario physician, businessman, and political figure. He represented Toronto in the Legislative Assembly of Ontario from 1893 to 1898 as a Conservative and then Conservative-Protestant Protective Association member.

Background
He was born in Toronto in 1856, the son of George Ryerson and Isabella Dorcas Sterling, and studied in Galt and then at the Trinity Medical School in Toronto, receiving his MD in 1876. He continued his studies in Europe. In 1880, he set up practice in Toronto and also lectured on eye, ear and throat diseases at Trinity Medical School. Ryerson was also surgeon at the Andrew Mercer Eye and Ear Infirmary. He was surgeon with the Royal Grenadiers (10th battalion), serving during the North-West Rebellion. Ryerson helped found the Association of Medical Officers of the Canadian Militia and served as president from 1908 to 1909. He was later named honorary colonel for the Canadian Army Medical Corps. Ryerson helped establish the St John Ambulance Association in Ontario and the Canadian Red Cross Society.

On November 14, 1882, he married Mary Amelia Crowther, daughter of barrister James Crowther. They had five children: George Crowther (born 1883), Yoris Sterling (born 1886), Eric Egerton (born 1888), Arthur Connaught (born 1890), and Laura Mary (born 1893). His wife's sister, Sarah Ellen Crowther, married the Right Hon. Sir William Mulock, PC, KCMG, KC, MP, afterwards Post-Master-General and Chief Justice of Ontario. Mary Crowther Ryerson and daughter Laura were passengers aboard the Lusitania when it was sunk off the Irish coast in May 1915. Laura survived, Mary did not.

On June 8, 1916, he remarried to Elizabeth Van Hook Thomas, daughter of Edwin Ross Thomas. Ryerson retired from his medical practice in 1920 and moved to Niagara-on-the-Lake. Elizabeth died on September 4, 1924. Ryerson died of a heart attack in Toronto on May 20, 1925.

Politics
He was elected to the legislative assembly in an 1893 by-election and re-elected in 1894. He did not run in 1898 due to poor health. In 1896, Ryerson helped establish the United Empire Loyalist Association of Ontario. In 1902, he failed to secure nomination by the Conservative Party when he attempted to run for election in Toronto North.

References

Mary Amelia Ryerson - The Lusitania Resource

1855 births
1925 deaths
Canadian otolaryngologists
Canadian military doctors
Progressive Conservative Party of Ontario MPPs
Protestant Protective Association MPPs